Graham Storer is a former football (soccer) player who represented New Zealand at international level.

Storer represented New Zealand at under 20 level before making his full All Whites debut in a 2–1 win over China on 20 May 1975 and ended his international playing career with seven A-international caps to his credit, his final cap an appearance in a 0–1 loss to Australia on 29 February 1976.

References 

Year of birth missing (living people)
Living people
New Zealand association footballers
New Zealand international footballers
Association football defenders